SC21 or SC-21 may refer to:
 SC21 (United Kingdom), a programme to transform British aerospace and defence supply chains
 SC21 (United States), a United States Navy program of the 1990s for new ship designs
 , a United States Navy submarine chaser commissioned in 1917 and sold in 1921